The 1990–91 OB I bajnokság season was the 54th season of the OB I bajnokság, the top level of ice hockey in Hungary. Eight teams participated in the league, and Ferencvarosi TC won the championship.

Regular season

Final round

Qualification round

Playoffs

7th place 
 Újpesti Dózsa SC II - Sziketherm HK Dunaújváros 2:0 (4:3, 5:3)

5th place 
 Miskolci HC - Nepstadion NSzE Budapest 2:0 (7:3, 8:4)

3rd place
 Újpesti Dózsa SC - Alba Volán Székesfehérvár 3:0 (6:3, 10:2, 9:3)

Final 
 Ferencvárosi TC - Lehel SE Jászberény 4:2 (0:3, 18:3, 3:2, 2:6, 7:2, 3:2)

External links
 Season on hockeyarchives.info

1990-91
Hun
OB